Båtsfjord may refer to:

Places
Båtsfjord Municipality, a municipality in Finnmark county, Norway
Båtsfjord (village), a village in Båtsfjord municipality in Finnmark county, Norway
Båtsfjord Airport, an airport in Båtsfjord municipality in Finnmark county, Norway
Båtsfjord Airport (1973–99), an airport used from 1973 to 1999 in Båtsfjord municipality in Finnmark county, Norway
Båtsfjord Church, a church in Båtsfjord municipality in Finnmark county, Norway
Båtsfjord, or Båtsfjorden, a fjord in Båtsfjord municipality in Finnmark county, Norway